CPI Property Group (“CPIPG”) is a real estate landlord of income-generating commercial properties focused on the Czech Republic, Berlin, Warsaw and the Central & Eastern European (CEE) region. It was founded in the Czech Republic in 1991.

The company's headquarters are in Luxembourg, and its shares are listed on the Frankfurt Stock Exchange.

Radovan Vítek is the founder and majority shareholder of the company, holding approximately 88.8% of CPIPG's share capital and 89.4% (as of 31 December 2021) of voting rights directly and through vehicles controlled by him.

CPIPG's owned real estate portfolio is valued at €18.1 billion (as at 31 March 2022), comprising more than 570 commercial properties, over 4,000 international and local tenants, and exposure to multiple geographies and property segments. CPIPG’s portfolio is split as follows: office assets (49% of the total portfolio by value), primarily in central European capital cities such as Berlin (GSG Berlin) Prague, Warsaw and Budapest; retail assets (24%), primarily in the Czech Republic; residential assets (8%), mainly in the Czech Republic; hotels and resorts (5%); and complementary assets (14%), primarily comprising land bank, development properties and industrial and logistics properties. CPIPG's properties generated over €110 million of net rental income in the first quarter of 2022and were 93.7% occupied.

As of 31 May 2022, CPIPG owns a controlling 76.9% stake in IMMOFINANZ AG and a 42.6% (directly and indirectly) stake in S IMMO AG, two Austrian real-estate companies listed on the Vienna stock exchange.

CPIPG's Board of Directors consists of three independent directors (Edward Hughes, Omar Sattar, and Jonathan Lewis), two non-executive members (Philippe Magistretti, Tim Scoble as Apollo representative) and three  members of management (Martin Němeček, Tomas Salajka, and Oliver Schlink).

CPIPG has investment-grade credit ratings from international rating agencies Standard & Poor's (BBB), Moody's Investors Service (Baa2) and Japan Credit Rating Agency (A-).

Since 2017, CPIPG has issued more than €8.7 billion (equivalent) of bonds (including Schuldschein) in eight different currencies on the international capital markets. The Group was the first borrower from the CEE region to issue benchmark green bonds in 2019 and has further strengthened its ESG agenda and capital structure by becoming in 2022 the first real estate company from the region to issue sustainability-linked bonds in the amount of €700 million. 

CPIPG has a Second Party Opinion rating from Sustainalytics with a Low Risk score of 12.8 / 100 as of 2021, putting the Group among the top 5% of issuers globally.

History 
The company's history dates back to the foundation of Czech Property Investments a.s. (CPI a.s.) in 1991. Throughout the 1990s the company expanded its business abroad through acquisitions in Central Eastern Europe, across multiple real estate segments, including the acquisition of a residential portfolio in the Czech Republic in 2003.

In 2013, CPI a.s. acquired ABLON Group Limited, which owned a significant property portfolio in the CEE region. In 2014, CPI a.s. combined with Orco Property Group, the majority owner of Orco Germany, which owned a portfolio of office properties in Berlin. Following the company's name change to GSG Group, the company was renamed again to CPI Property Group.

Key historical milestones 

 Founded in 1991 as CPI a.s. 
 In 2002, CPIPG issued its first bonds on the Czech market.
 Between 1999 and 2003, CPIPG acquired a portfolio of residential assets in the Czech Republic.
 In 2013, CPIPG acquired the investments and development company, ABLON Group Limited, which owned a significant property portfolio in CEE.
 In 2014, CPIPG was created through the combination of CPI Investments a.s. and Orco Property Group S.A. In the same year, the company completed the development of Quadrio in Prague.
 In 2016, CPIPG acquired a majority stake in Orco Property Group (OPG) and CPI Hotels, a.s. (CPI Hotels), a hotel operator primarily in the Czech Republic and CEE. A majority stake was also acquired in Sunčani Hvar d.d. (SHH), a company operating resort hotels on the island of Hvar, Croatia.
 In 2017, CPIPG acquired a retail portfolio of 11 shopping centres located in the Czech Republic and CEE from CBRE Global Investors.
 In 2017, CPIPG achieved an inaugural Baa3 credit rating from Moody's Investors Service and issued an inaugural international bond.
 In 2019 and 2020, CPIPG expanded its footprint in the Warsaw office market by acquiring nine office properties, including Warsaw Financial Centre.
 In February 2020, CPIPG became the largest shareholder in Globalworth, which owns office properties in Poland and Bucharest, Romania.
 In April 2021, CPIPG and German real estate company, Aroundtown SA, jointly announced a cash tender offer for the remaining shares in Globalworth. CPIPG and Aroundtown currently hold 134.3m Globalworth shares combined, representing 60% of the company.
 On 5 August 2021, CPIPG agreed on a strategic framework with certain companies of the DeA Capital Group (“DeA Capital”) and Nova RE SIIQ S.p.A. (“Nova RE”, now renamed to Next Re SIIQ S.p.A.).
 On 22 November 2021, CPIPG announced a capital increase, with funds managed by affiliates of Apollo Global Management agreeing Apollo’s subscription for new shares for €300 million. The capital increase was completed on 30 November 2021.
 As of May 2022, CPIPG’s controlling investment in IMMOFINANZ is around 77%. For legacy reasons, IMMOFINANZ also owns a stake of 26.5% of S IMMO. As a result, CPIPG directly and indirectly owns a total of 42.6% in S IMMO.

References

Real estate companies of Luxembourg
Real estate companies established in 1991